The 2000 Kilkenny Senior Hurling Championship was the 106th staging of the Kilkenny Senior Hurling Championship since its establishment by the Kilkenny County Board in 1887. The championship began on 19 August 2000 and ended on 22 October 2000.

Glenmore were the defending champions, however, they were defeated by O'Loughlin Gaels at the semi-final stage.

On 15 October 2000, Graigue-Ballycallan won the title after a 0–16 to 0–09 defeat of O'Loughlin Gaels in the final at Nowlan Park. It was their second championship title overall and their first title in two championship seasons. It remains their last championship triumph.

Nigel Skehan of the O'Loughlin Gaels club was the championship's top scorer with 2-23.

Team changes

To Championship

Promoted from the Kilkenny Intermediate Hurling Championship
 John Locke's

From Championship

Relegated to the Kilkenny Intermediate Hurling Championship
 St. Martin's

Results

First round

Relegation play-offs

Quarter-finals

Semi-finals

Final

Championship statistics

Top scorers

Overall

Single game

Miscellaneous

 O'Loughlin Gaels qualified for the final for the first time.

References

Kilkenny Senior Hurling Championship
Kilkenny Senior Hurling Championship